Kai Breder Fjell (March 2, 1907 – January 10, 1989) was a Norwegian painter, printmaker and scenographer.

Personal life 
Fjell was born on a farm in the village Skoger near Drammen. His father was a farmer and a painter, Conrad Bendiks Fjeld. His mother was a sister of Marie Hamsun. Fjell married Ingeborg Helene Holt (1907–1999) in 1931. They had two children, Sindre and Håvard Fjell.

Career
Kai Fjell became a pupil of Carl von Hanno in Oslo in 1926. A year later, he enrolled at the Norwegian National Academy of Fine Arts of Oslo, where his main teachers were August Eiebakke and  Olaf Willums from 1929.  His debut exhibition in Oslo Art Society in 1932 was largely unsuccessful. Fjell achieved immediate success with his exhibition at Kunstnernes Hus at Oslo in 1937, where all the exhibited paintings were sold.

Kai Fjell early developed an ornamental expressionism. His pictures are heavily influenced by rural life and traditional Norwegian folk art.
Fjell's early paintings are dominated by dark and earthy hues and often has grotesque motifs. His later works are significantly brighter, more daring in their use of colour, and tranquil in mood. He also found an outlet as a book illustrator and as a scenographer. Throughout his long career, the female figure and various fertility-symbols are recurring motifs in Fjell's pictures. Fjell's main work consists of  Kalven reiser seg, Violinen and Likkjøreren on display at the Nasjonalmuseet.

He was appointed Commander of the Order of St. Olav in 1976. He was active as a painter until the end of his life.  Kai Fjell died in his home at Lysaker.

Selected works 
Barnemorderske, 1934
Likkjøreren, 1936
Kalven reiser seg, 1936 
Under takrenna, 1936
Modellenes hyllest, 1936 
Gratulanter, 1937
Musikanten, 1937
Den sunkne by, 1954

References

External links 
 Short biography by Kai Fjell's son Bamse Fjell (In Norwegian)

20th-century Norwegian painters
Norwegian male painters
Expressionist painters
1907 births
1989 deaths
Artists from Bærum
Order of Saint Olav
20th-century Norwegian male artists